Lane Spina (born 3 January 1962) is an American freestyle skier who won two medals in demonstration events of the Olympic Games; at the 1988 Winter Olympics in Calgary, Canada and the 1992 Winter Olympics in Albertville, France. He also won the Freestyle World Championships in 1991 in Lake Placid, New York. Spina was born and raised in Reno, Nevada, and graduated from Wooster High School. Following his ski career, he went on to achieve academic degrees in both Mechanical Engineering and Masters of Business Administration (MBA), from the University of Nevada, Las Vegas.

Skiing competitions

Freestyle Skiing World Cup

Olympics
Spina medaled both time ski ballet was held as an Olympic demonstration event; both at the 1988 and the 1992 Winter Olympics that were held in Calgary, Canada and Albertville, France, respectively. He won a silver medal in 1988 and a bronze medal in 1992.

References

American male freestyle skiers
Sportspeople from Reno, Nevada
University of Nevada, Las Vegas alumni
Living people
1960s births